Yrjö Kylmälä (born 20 September 1911, date of death unknown) was a Finnish footballer. He played in seven matches for the Finland national football team from 1934 to 1939. He was also part of Finland's squad for the football tournament at the 1936 Summer Olympics, but he did not play in any matches.

References

External links
 

1911 births
Year of death missing
Finnish footballers
Finland international footballers
Place of birth missing
Association football forwards